(Butadiene)iron tricarbonyl is an organoiron compound with the formula (CH)Fe(CO). It is a well-studied metal complex of butadiene.  An orange-colored viscous liquid that freezes just below room temperature, the compound adopts a piano stool structure.

The complex was first prepared by heating iron pentacarbonyl with the diene.

Related compounds
Iron(0) complexes of conjugated dienes have been extensively studied. In the butadiene series, (η-CH)Fe(CO) and (η:η-CH)(Fe(CO)) have been crystallized.  Many related complexes are known for substituted butadienes and related species. The species (η-isoprene)iron tricarbonyl is chiral.

Related compounds
 Cyclobutadieneiron tricarbonyl

References

Carbonyl complexes
Organoiron compounds
Half sandwich compounds
Diene complexes
Iron(0) compounds